Horen Sing Bey is an Indian politician from the state of Assam. He is elected to the Lok Sabha, lower house of the Parliament of India from Autonomous District, Assam in the 2019 Indian general election as a member of the Bharatiya Janata Party.

Horen Sing Bey is former leader of Karbi Nationalist movement for Autonomous State in Karbi Anglong Autonomous District of Assam. He is former leader of now disbanded United People's Democratic Solidarity (UPDS).

References

Living people
Lok Sabha members from Assam
People from Karbi Anglong district
Bharatiya Janata Party politicians from Assam
India MPs 2019–present
1970 births